Ivan Dodig and Filip Polášek won the tournament by defeating the defending champions Łukasz Kubot and Marcelo Melo in the final, 6−3, 7−6(7−4).

Seeds

Draw

Draw

Qualifying

Seeds

Qualifiers
  Kyle Edmund /  Dan Evans

Qualifying draw

References
 Main Draw
 Qualifying Draw

China Open - Men's Doubles
Doubles men